Possessed by the Night is a 1994 erotic thriller directed by Fred Olen Ray, who also co-wrote and had a brief appearance in the film.  It also stars Shannon Tweed.

Synopsis
When a horror writer named Howard Hansen buys an oversized jar containing a strange-looking pickled monster from a tiny shop in Chinatown, he quickly falls under its supernatural influence.  Not only can he churn out manuscript pages like never before, he also becomes more sexually aggressive.  His unusual change begins to trouble his wife, Peggy, particularly after the arrival of his new sexy blonde live-in secretary, Carol McKay.

What Howard and Peggy don't know is that Carol is conspiring with her partner Murray Dunlap, Howard's greedy agent, to steal his manuscript.  Carol soon becomes possessed by the thing in the jar as well, playing sexual violent games with Howard and Peggy, terrorizing Peggy at every turn, and ultimately turning on Murray, leading to a hyper-violent climax which has nearly everyone blasting away at their co-conspirator with automatic weaponry.

Cast

 Shannon Tweed – Carol McKay
 Ted Prior – Howard Hansen
 Sandahl Bergman – Peggy Hansen
 Chad McQueen – Gus
 Frank Sivero – Murray Dunlap
 Turhan Bey – Calvin
 Henry Silva – Scott Lindsey
 Sigal Diamant – Receptionist
 Joe Kuroda – Mr. Wong
 Byron Mann – Fok Ping Wong
 Melissa Brasselle – Trina
 Fred Olen Ray – Waiter
 Amy Rochelle – Bikini Woman
 Alan Amiel – Detective
 Elana Shoshan – Sheila
 Peter Spellos – Big Ed
 Kimberly O' Brien – Jill
 Dawn Warner Ramos – Prostitute (uncredited)

References

External links

Films directed by Fred Olen Ray
American erotic thriller films
1990s erotic thriller films
1990s English-language films
1990s American films